(abbreviated as NBCUEJ) is a Japanese music, anime, and home entertainment production and distribution enterprise headquartered in Akasaka, Minato, Tokyo. It is primarily involved in the production and distribution of anime within Japan.

The company was founded in March 1981 by Pioneer Corporation as LaserDisc Corporation, a LaserDisc player production company. In 1989, the company was renamed Pioneer LDC, Inc. as it branched into the anime, music, and film industries, and later Geneon Entertainment Inc. (after being acquired by Dentsu in 2003). In 2008, Geneon merged with Universal Pictures Japan to form Geneon Universal Entertainment Japan, LLC; in 2013, the company changed its name to the current NBCUniversal Entertainment Japan. Some of the well-known anime series the company has produced are A Certain Magical Index, The Heroic Legend of Arslan, Danganronpa: The Animation, Golden Kamuy, and Seraph of the End among many others.

Their North American branch (founded as Pioneer Entertainment, later Geneon USA) specialized in translating and distributing anime and related merchandise, such as soundtracks across the region. After declining fortunes, it was shut down in 2007. After its shutdown, they licensed their titles out to other anime distributors for distribution, such as Funimation. At one point, they distributed their titles directly in Australia through Universal Pictures and Sony's home video joint venture, but they have stopped.

Despite the name, NBCUniversal Entertainment Japan does not distribute Universal Pictures films theatrically in Japan; Toho (through Toho-Towa) exclusively distributes them for Japanese theaters.

History

Founding 
The first anime title they released was Tenchi Muyo! Ryo-Ohki in 1992. Its North American division was later renamed again to Pioneer Entertainment.

Geneon is a portmanteau of the English words, generate and eon.

Sale to NBC Universal 

On November 12, 2008, Dentsu announced that it was selling 80.1% of its ownership in the company to NBC Universal's Universal Pictures International Entertainment (UPIE), who planned to merge the company with its Universal Pictures Japan division—which had no longer theatrically distributed Universal Pictures films in Japan, having delegated its theatrical distribution tasks to Toho subsidiary Toho-Towa since the dissolution of United International Pictures Japan in 2007—to form a new company. On December 9, 2013, the company once again changed its name to NBCUniversal Entertainment Japan LLC.

On February 17, 2013, they made a partnership with Universal Sony Pictures Home Entertainment to distribute their anime titles directly in Australia and New Zealand.

Purchase of Paramount Japan 
On January 1, 2016, Paramount Japan was purchased by NBCUniversal and dissolved shortly afterwards. This was due to Paramount Pictures establishing a joint-venture with Toho-Towa named Towa Pictures Company Limited, which would distribute Paramount's films in Japan.

On July 12, 2017, they announced a partnership with Crunchyroll to co-produce anime with "international appeal".

Geneon USA

Beginnings 
Viz Media (then known as Viz Video) made a deal with Geneon (then known as Pioneer) to release Viz's properties to DVD, such as Ranma ½ before Viz began producing their own DVDs. Pioneer also worked with Bandai Entertainment before they started to produce their own DVDs. On November 11, 2004, they signed a deal with Toei Animation to distribute some of their titles into the North American market. Launching titles included Air Master, Interlude, and Slam Dunk. However, on September 18, 2006, the deal ended and all of the released titles went out of print. In 2006, they were named "Best Anime Company" by the Society for the Promotion of Japanese Animation. On March 5, 2007, they became the exclusive North American distributor for Bandai Visual USA.

Shutdown 
Four months later, it was announced that ADV Films would take over the distribution, marketing, and sales of their properties in the United States, starting October 1, 2007. According to the announcement, they would continue to acquire, license, and produce English subs and dubs of anime for release in North America. However, the deal was canceled in September before it was implemented, with neither company giving details as to why beyond stating they were "unable to reach a mutual agreement."

On September 26, 2007, they announced that they would close distribution operations, with titles solicited through November 5 shipped. Titles that were in mid-release or licensed but unreleased were left in limbo. The Bandai Visual USA titles that were being distributed by Geneon were not affected by this closure, though some were delayed while Bandai Visual found a new distributor. Another North American anime company, Funimation, began negotiating with them to distribute some of the company's licensed titles. In July 2008, a formal arrangement was announced and Funimation acquired the rights to "manufacture, sell, and distribute" various Geneon anime and live-action titles.

Afterwards 
Several of their former titles were re-licensed by other companies, such as Funimation,  Sentai Filmworks, Discotek Media, and Nozomi Entertainment.

Other ventures 
The company is also a record label, which means they handle music distribution for multiple musicians, like fripSide and Kotoko. Their first major live event was called the "NBCUniversal Anime x Music festival", and was held in 2018. They also use their music as soundtracks for their anime productions. One example of that is the band fripSide performing the first opening for A Certain Scientific Railgun.

As Pioneer LDC, they developed and published several video games for the Sega Saturn and PlayStation, such as games based on Magical Girl Pretty Sammy, Tenchi Muyo!, and Serial Experiments Lain.

They also opened an anime cafe in Akihabara, which featured items themed towards their series, such as A Certain Magical Index, Is the Order a Rabbit?, and Yuyushiki. Some examples of these items were a drink with a hand inside, hot chocolate and spaghetti, and curry pizza.

References

External links 
  
 
 
 
 
 

 
2003 mergers and acquisitions
2008 mergers and acquisitions
2016 mergers and acquisitions
Entertainment companies of Japan
Mass media companies based in Tokyo
Anime companies
Entertainment companies established in 1981
Mass media companies established in 1981
Japanese companies established in 1981
Former Vivendi subsidiaries
NBCUniversal
Japanese subsidiaries of foreign companies
Universal Pictures subsidiaries
Japanese record labels